Comrade (1917–1928) was a British Thoroughbred racehorse who won the first-ever running of the Prix de l'Arc de Triomphe in 1920.

Owned by the Evremond de Saint-Alary whose stable raced in England and France, Comrade was purchased for only 26 guineas. Trained by the renowned British horse trainer Peter Gilpin, Comrade won all three of his races as a two-year-old in 1919. In July 1920 the three-year-old Comrade won the most important race in France at the time, the Grand Prix de Paris. He returned to France in October and was ridden to victory by jockey Frank Bullock in the inaugural running of what is now France's most prestigious race, the Prix de l'Arc de Triomphe, beating the six-year-old King's Cross by a length.

According to France Galop, Comrade was the best middle-distance runner of his generation.

References

 Comrade's pedigree and partial racing stats

1917 racehorse births
1928 racehorse deaths
Racehorses bred in the United Kingdom
Racehorses trained in the United Kingdom
Arc winners
Thoroughbred family 19-c